Samantha Tanson (born on 4 April 1977) is a Luxembourgish lawyer and politician. She has been the Minister of Culture since December 2018 and the Minister of Justice since September 2019. She was also the Minister of Housing between December 2018 and October 2019.

Biography
Tanson studied at Pantheon-Sorbonne University in Paris and completed her studies with a master's degree in law and a diploma from Sciences Po Paris.

She became a lawyer in 2005.

In 2009, she became one of the two spokespeople of the youth organisation of The Greens party. She was the spokeswoman of the party from 2009 to 2010 (algonside Christian Goebel) and later chaired the party. Moreover, she was the vice-chairwoman of the party foundation Grénger Stëftung alongside Claude Turmes. 

From 2011 to 2018, Tanson represented The Greens in the Luxembourg communal council. From 2013 to 2017, she was the Luxembourg City échevine in charge of finance and mobility.

On June 7th, 2015, she was appointed to the Council of State as a replacement for Agnès Rausch. However, she resigned from that position in order to replace her party colleague Claude Adam in the Chamber of Deputies. She was re-elected as a deputy in the October 2018 federal election. Nonetheless, she resigned from her seat to take office as the Minister of Housing and the Minister of Culture within the Second Bettel–Schneider Ministry on December 5th, 2018.

On September 6, 2019, Tanson became the interim Minister of Justice as a replacement for Félix Braz, who suffered from severe illness. She was appointed as the titular Minister of Justice on September 25, 2019.

References

External links

Sam Tanson, Government of the Grand-Duchy of Luxembourg
Sam Tanson's official website (in Luxembourgish) 

Women lawyers
Women radio journalists
The Greens (Luxembourg) politicians
Members of the Chamber of Deputies (Luxembourg)
Women government ministers of Luxembourg
Ministers for Justice of Luxembourg
Members of the Council of State of Luxembourg

Female justice ministers

People from Luxembourg City

1977 births
Living people